The Port of Arrecife is the main port facility for Lanzarote and the second busiest in the Canary Islands in terms of passengers. It handles passenger ferries, cruise ships and ro-ro cargo, but also bulk, breakbulk, containers, liquid bulk, and has a large fishing port.

Cruise port
Arrecife is a major cruise port with over 400,000 cruise passenger visits per annum. Most cruise ships now dock at the La Boca de Puerto Naos, which is closer to the city than the berths at the commercial port.

References

External links

 
 
 
 
Arrecife
Buildings and structures in the Canary Islands 
Transport in the Canary Islands 
 
 

es:Puerto de Arrecife